Worner (or Wörner) may refer to:

People
Anita Wörner (1942), German runner and Olympic competitor
Anna Wörner (born 1989), German freestyle skier
Bert Worner (1929–2012), Australian rules footballer
Dominik Wörner (born 1970), German classical bass singer
Elfie Wörner (1941–2006), German journalist and humanitarian; spouse of Manfred Wörner
George Worner (1855–1950), American politician
Johann-Dietrich Wörner (born 1954), German administrator (ESA; GAC), civil engineer, and professor
Manfred Wörner (1934–1994), German politician and diplomat, defense minister, Secretary General of NATO; spouse of Elfie Wörner
Marysole Wörner Baz (born 1936), Mexican painter and sculptor
Natalia Wörner (born 1967), German actress
Ross Worner (born 1989), English professional footballer who plays as goalkeeper
Tim Worner (born ?), Australian businessman

Places
Wörner (Alps), a mountain in the Karwendel on the border between Bavaria and Tyrol
Wörner Gap, in eastern Livingston Island in the South Shetland Islands, Antarctica

Other
Manfred Wörner Foundation, a Bulgarian not-for-profit non-governmental organization

See also
Woerner, a surname